Aleksandr Sharapov (born 31 May 1971) is a Belarusian cyclist. He competed in the men's individual road race at the 1996 Summer Olympics.

References

External links
 

1971 births
Living people
Belarusian male cyclists
Olympic cyclists of Belarus
Cyclists at the 1996 Summer Olympics
Cyclists from Minsk